Mario Rubén Vargas Vidal (born 1963) is a Chilean biologist who was elected as a member of the Chilean Constitutional Convention.

References

External links
 

Living people
1963 births
21st-century Chilean politicians
Pontifical Catholic University of Valparaíso alumni
Members of the Chilean Constitutional Convention
Socialist Party of Chile politicians